Stanley MacDonald (born 29 June 1966 in Amsterdam) is a Dutch footballer who played for Eerste Divisie clubs Stormvogels Telstar, SC Heerenveen, FC Oss, N.E.C and FC Eindhoven during the 1991-2001 football seasons. He also played a season with K. Beringen-Heusden-Zolder.

References

External links
football profile

Dutch footballers
Dutch expatriate footballers
Footballers from Amsterdam
SC Telstar players
SC Heerenveen players
TOP Oss players
NEC Nijmegen players
FC Eindhoven players
Eerste Divisie players
Challenger Pro League players
Expatriate footballers in Belgium
1966 births
Living people
Association football midfielders